Manzil is a 1994 Maldivian drama Television series directed by Mariyam Shauqee and Arifa Ibrahim. Produced by Shauqee, the series stars Abdulla Munaz, Aishath Shiranee, Mariyam Nisha and Arifa Ibrahim in pivotal roles.

Premise
An intelligent and honest orphan, Zahidha (Aishath Shiranee) moves out of her sister's house unable to tolerate their verbal abuse and settles as a maid at Arifa Ibrahim's house where she befriends her only daughter, Nazima (Mariyam Nisha). As days pass by, her commitment to work is noted by the house owner and the elder son, Nadheem (Abdulla Munaz) while she is bullied by the younger son, Waheed (Mohamed Aboobakuru).

Cast 
 Abdulla Munaz as Nadheem
 Aishath Shiranee as Zahidha
 Mariyam Nisha as Nazima
 Mohamed Aboobakuru as Waheed
 Fathimath
 Arifa Ibrahim
 Ibrahim Shakir
 Zareena Yoosuf
 Hawwa Enee
 Gamini
 Suneetha Ali as Jeeza

Soundtrack

References

Serial drama television series
Maldivian television shows